The 1987 NCAA Division I men's lacrosse tournament was the 17th annual Division I NCAA Men's Lacrosse Championship tournament. Twelve NCAA Division I college men's lacrosse teams met after having played their way through a regular season, and for some, a conference tournament.

Tournament overview
The championship game was played at Rutgers Stadium in front of 16,901 fans. The game saw the Johns Hopkins University defeat Cornell University by the score of 11–10.

Craig Bubier scored with 1:51 left in the game gave Hopkins the victory, the goal coming off a fast break after Quint Kessenich intercepted a long clear by the Cornell goalie. Kessenich had 21 saves for Hopkins. The title was the seventh NCAA overall for the Blue Jays and the third in their prior four years.

This was the seventh NCAA championship for Hopkins since tournament play began in 1971 and the 12th appearance in 16 title matches for the Blue Jays. Hopkins was sparked on defense by goalkeeper Quint Kessenich and Dave Pietramala, while National Hall of Fame member attackman Tim Goldstein tallied two goals and added six assists for Cornell. Cornell had defeated a Syracuse team, 18 to 15 in the semifinals, which featured Paul and Gary Gait, who would go on to capture three straight national title games.

Tournament results

Tournament boxscores

Tournament Finals

Tournament Semi-finals

Tournament Quarterfinals

Tournament First Round

All-Tournament Team
Tim Goldstein, Cornell (Named the tournament's Most Outstanding Player)
Brian Wood, Johns Hopkins
Craig Bubier, Johns Hopkins
Gary Gait, Syracuse
Bob Cummings, Cornell
Vince Angotti, Cornell
Aaron Jones, Cornell
Dave Pietramala, Johns Hopkins
Steve Mitchell, Johns Hopkins
Quint Kessenich, Johns Hopkins

References 

NCAA Division I Men's Lacrosse Championship
NCAA Division I Men's Lacrosse Championship
NCAA Division I Men's Lacrosse Championship
NCAA Division I Men's Lacrosse Championship
NCAA Division I Men's Lacrosse Championship